= Embassy of Nigeria, Doha =

Diplomatic mission of Nigeria for Qatar

- Location within Qatar
- Location: Doha
- Address: 941 Istiqbal Street Building 39, Zone 63 Dafna, West Bay Doha
- Coordinates: 25.33235°N 51.51825°E
- Opened: 2013
- Ambassador: Mr. Yakubu Abdullahi Ahmed
- Jurisdiction: Qatar
- Website: nigeriaembassydoha.org

The Embassy of Nigeria, Doha is the Nigerian diplomatic mission in Qatar established in 2013 and currently headed by ambassador Yakubu Abdullahi Ahmed.

== Brief history ==
The embassy of Nigeria in Qatar was set up in 2013 to foster good bilateral relationship between the two countries. It was the same year that the state of Qatar also opened an embassy in Nigeria.

== Challenges ==
In February 2022, the International Center for Investigative Reporting (ICIR) reported that "Nigerians residing in Qatar have continued to face difficulty acquiring a Nigerian passport as the embassy in Doha does not have the machines to process the travel document, but relies on the passport intervention team in the United Arab Emirates". The situation resulted in backlog of applications submitted and many Nigerian expatriates facing the risk of losing their jobs, blocking of bank accounts and even deportation.
